Maximilian Marcoll (born in 1981 in Lübeck) is a German composer and performer.

Biography 
From 1992 to 1997 Marcoll studied percussion at the Lübeck Academy of Music, as of 1997 he continued to study composition with Friedhelm Döhl and Dirk Reith in Lübeck and 2001–2006 at the Folkwang Hochschule with Thomas Neuhaus, Dietrich Hahne, Günther Steinke and Orm Finnendahl. In 2002 he founded the electronic duo dis.playce together with Hannes Seidl. Since 2006 he has been a member of the artist group stock11. From 2007 to 2014 he taught at the Institute for Music and Media of the Robert Schumann Hochschule, also since 2007 at the Institute for study preparation of the Music School Kreuzberg in Berlin. Since 2017 he holds a teaching position at the University of the Arts Bremen.

He writes works for solo instruments, for ensembles of various instrumentations, including vocal ensembles, as well as electronic music. His works also include sound installations, videos and media art. For performances of his works, he has collaborated with numerous soloists, ensembles and conductors, such as Eva Zöllner, Heather Roche, Sebastian Berweck, Mark Lorenz Kysela, LUX:NM, Suono Mobile, Ensemble Handwerk, Neue Vocalsolisten, AAA---AAA, Ensemble Mosaik, Ensemble United Berlin, Ensemble Nadar, Mocrep, Oh-Ton, Vladimir Jurowski, Enno Poppe, José Luis Castillo and many more.  In 2005 he received the Folkwang Award and in 2006 the Franz Liszt Award of the Music Academy Weimar. For his Amproprifications 6.1 & 6.2 he received an honorary mention at the MA/IN Festival in Matera, Italy in 2018. Residencies led him to the CMMAS in Morelia, the ICST in Zurich, the Künstlerhaus Lukas in Ahrenshoop and the Institute for Electronic Music and Acoustics (iem) in Graz.

Work 
Marcoll's works repeatedly focus on political and societal aspects. In the installation "Umverteilung" in Ditzingen 2010, for example, he focussed on tracing social imbalances. In his series of works "Compounds" (2008-2014), he combined collected sound material from his immediate surroundings into a "material network" that served as the basis for 8 solo and ensemble compositions. Other works with a strong political impact are "Personal Data" from 2013, a "speech performance for communication monitoring" as well as "If music be the food of love", which deals with music used for torture in US-American secret prisons.

Adhan 
Marcoll's piece "Adhan" for Carillon and Tape, written in 2015 but not premiered in its original form, attracted some attention. It combined the singing of a muezzin with the bells of a carillon and the tone of a Shofar. The concerts planned for Whitsun 2015 on the Carillon in Berlin's Tiergarten were cancelled after the carillonist refused to perform the piece, which had been commissioned for this occasion. Marcoll said in interviews that the reason why he wrote the piece would now become the reason why it would not be performed. Up to this day "Adhan" was performed exclusively in a special indoor version for a church in Berlin-Schöneberg.

Amproprifications 
Since 2016, Marcoll has been working on a series of works called "Amproprifications" (a portmanteau composed of appropriation and amplification) in which existing works by other composers are modulated by volume changes in real time.

"In short, all Amproprifications are elaborate amplification layers for preexisting pieces by other composers. The parts of the performers consist in the performance of scores by other composers. One specific score is performed for each piece in the series. Not a single note of the original's text is being altered, nothing is added, nothing is omitted, nothing is being changed in any way. The electronics on the other hand solely consist of amplification. No additional sound whatsoever is being produced. The possibilities of interference span a large variety of movements, from almost inaudibly slow fadings to extremely fast and brutal chopping. In a figure of speech, all Amproprifications are "silent" pieces. They themselves do not contain or produce any sound. They do, however, constitute filters, readings, processings of the original pieces. The development of the amplification layers are very different each time and stem from aspects regarding structure and content that are based in the respective original: The originals are being superimposed with external layers which have their origin in the works itself."

In addition to the acoustic versions, the amproprifications are also available in the form of visualizations. Marcoll transforms the amplification levels into two-dimensional graphics, which are also shown in exhibitions.

Selected works

Solo 

 Amproprification #5: Goldrausch, Mark Lorenz Kysela, 2017, 40' (soprano saxophone and electronics)
 Amproprification #2: Ombra, Franco Donatori, 2016, 13' (contrabass clarinet and electronics)
 Amproprification #4: Splitting 8.1, Michael Maierhof, 2016, 15' (saxophone and electronics)
 Amproprification #1: Sequenza 9c, Luciano Berio, 2016, 14' (bass clarinet and electronics)
 Adhan, 2015, 9' (carillon and tape)
 Compoand No.6: VOICE ALARM AIR MACHINE, 2012, 14' (flute and electronics)
 Compoand No.5: CONSTRUCTION ADJUSTMENT, 2011, 14' (percussion and electronics)
 Compoand No.1a: CAR SEX VOICE HONKER, 2009, 18' (accordion and Zuspiel)
 Samstag Morgen – Berlin Neukölln. Studie. and Selbstportrait. Mit Hirsch., 2007, 12' (piano and tape)

Chamber music 

 A C H K, 2019, 50' (2 e-guitars, electronics)
 Fremdbestimmt, 2018, 12' (prepared stroh-viola and narrator)
 Canone Monodico a 2, 2018, 7' (digitally controlled sawtooth wave generator)
 Amproprification #7: Weiss / Weisslich 17c, Peter Ablinger, 2017, 2' (snare drum and radio)
 Amproprification #3: Après un rêve, Gabriel Fauré, 2016, 4' (solo, piano and electronics)
 Heart Score Fetish, 2015, 15' (three performers, keyboard controlled amplification and live video)
 If music be the food of love, 2014, 12' (two soprano saxophones and electronics)
 Compoand No.3: MACHINE CONSTRUCTION AFTERMATH, 2011, 12' (microtonal brass trio and electronics)
 Compoand No.2a: AIR PRESSRE TRAIN TV, 2011, 18' (two percussionists and electronics)
 Compoand No.1: CAR SEX VOICE HONKER, 2008, 18' (two accordions and electronics)

Ensemble 

 Amproprification #9: Schrift/Bild/Schrift, Bernhard Lang, 2019, 22' (ensemble and electronics)
 Amproprification #8.1: Allegro con brio, Eroica, C.F.Ebers, L.v.Beethoven, 2018, 16' (ensemble and electronics)
 Amproprification #6.1 & #6.2: Kyire & Gloria, Missa Papae Marcelli, Giovanni Pierluigi da Palestrina, 2016, 10' (vocal ensemble and electronics)
 Drill & Sander, 2015, 10' (alto trombone, ensemble and electronics)
 Compoand No.8: BREAK REMOVE DEMOLISH, 2014, 15' (violin, cello, ensemble and electronics)
 Personal Data, 2013, 2' (at least 10 performers)
 Compoand No.7: OPERATION ENOK, 2013, 10' (ensemble and electronics)
 Compoand No.4: FRICTION MACHINE ALARM SIGNAL CONSTRUCTION, 2010, 15' (ensemble and electronics)
 Compoand No.2: AIR PRESSURE TRAIN TV, 2009, 18' (six percussionists and electronics)

Fixed media 

 Decaying Values, 2014
 Notturno. Kanon mit Schalentieren, 2008, 2'
 Folgesätze, 2002, 21'

Installations 

 DeadComposers.net, 2018 (web app)
 Control Issues #1: Motorphaser, 2018 (installation)
 FEED. (twelve self-portrait I do not want you to see), 2016 (installation)
 Umverteilung, 2010, (site specific)

CDs 

 Drill & Sander on LUX:NM: LUXUS, 2016 (Genuin)
 Compoand No.4 on stock11: 3,  2013 (aufabwegen)
 Samstag Morgen – Berlin Neukölln.  on stock11: 2, 2009 (Naivsuper)
 dis.playce: HABITAT, 2009 (Creative Sources)
 dis.playce: Das Ende von Amerika, 2007 (Naivsuper)
 Marcoll/dis.playce: Split EP, 2006 (luvsound)
 dis.playce: R, 2005 (Naivsuper)

References

External links 
 

1981 births
Living people
21st-century German composers
21st-century German male musicians
Composers for carillon
Folkwang University of the Arts alumni
German male composers
Musicians from Lübeck
Academic staff of the University of the Arts Bremen